Elizabeth Lackfi (died 27 December 1428) was a Hungarian noble lady of the Lackfi family.

Elizabeth was daughter of Emeric I Lackfi, general starost of Ruthenia and Ban of Dalmatia (Transylvanian Voivodship) and of Hungary.

She was married to Spytek of Melsztyn and Jan Piast, Duke of Ziębice.

Children:

Jadwiga z Melsztyna
Dorota z Melsztyna
Katarzyna z Melsztyna
Spytek z Melsztyna
Jan z Melsztyna i Rabsztyna

In Poland she became known as Elżbieta Węgierka or Elżbieta Bebek.

1428 deaths
Year of birth unknown
Medieval Croatian nobility
Medieval Hungarian nobility
15th-century Croatian people
15th-century Hungarian people
Elizabeth